Ackerville is an unincorporated community in Wilcox County, Alabama, United States.  Ackerville has one site included on the National Register of Historic Places, the Ackerville Baptist Church of Christ.

History
A post office was established at Ackerville in 1892 and remained in operation until it was discontinued in 1940. The community was named in honor of the Acker family of area residents.

Geography

Demographics

Ackerville Precinct (1900-50)

Ackerville village has never reported a population figure separately on the U.S. Census as an unincorporated community. However, the 19th precinct within Wilcox County bore its name from 1900 to 1950. In the 1930 and 1940 returns, when the census recorded racial statistics for the precincts, both times reported a Black majority for the precinct. In 1960, the precincts were merged and/or reorganized into census divisions (as part of a general reorganization of counties) and it was consolidated into the census division of Pine Apple.

References

Unincorporated communities in Alabama
Unincorporated communities in Wilcox County, Alabama